The women's freestyle 60 kilograms is a competition featured at the 2014 World Wrestling Championships, and was held in Tashkent, Uzbekistan on 10 September 2014.

This freestyle wrestling competition consisted of a single-elimination tournament, with a repechage used to determine the winners of two bronze medals. The two finalists faced off for gold and silver medals. Each wrestler who lost to one of the two finalists moved into the repechage, culminating in a pair of bronze medal matches featuring the semifinal losers each facing the remaining repechage opponent from their half of the bracket. 

Each bout consists of a single round within a six-minute limit including two halves of three minutes. The wrestler who scores more points is the winner. 

Sükheegiin Tserenchimed of Mongolia won the gold medal after dominating Yuliya Ratkevich from Azerbaijan in the final 11–2. Natalia Golts of Russia and Taybe Yusein of Bulgaria shared the bronze medals. Golts beat Petra Olli of Finland by superiority while Yusein beat Johanna Mattsson of Sweden 6–2.

Results
Legend
F — Won by fall

Main bracket

Repechage

References
2014 World Championships preview in women’s freestyle wrestling at 60 kg/132 lbs.

External links
Official website

Women's freestyle 60 kg
World